Jared Nissim is the founder of social networking websites The Lunch Club, Meet The Neighbors and Speed Friending.

The Lunch Club 

In December 2001, while working from home as a corporate/technical writer, Nissim began posting to Craigslist with the aim of finding lunch companions. After months of informal lunches and craigslist postings, a community network of hundreds of people formed.  At first, members of the network referred to it as "The East Village Lunch Club" because Nissim kept his gatherings local to his neighborhood, Manhattan's East Village.  In mid-2002, when Nissim formalized the club as an organization and established a website, he dropped "East Village" and left the name as "The Lunch Club".

Meet the Neighbors 

In November 2004, Nissim launched a second social networking endeavor: Meet The Neighbors, a social network for people to connect with those in their own apartment building.

Speed Friending 
In March 2005 Nissim established an additional event format called Speed Friending.  After attending a speed dating event in 2003, Nissim adopted the format but changed the concept to fit in with The Lunch Club's mission to help people make friends. The service launched in New York in March 2005 and expanded to Boston and San Francisco the following year. In 2006 the term Speed Friending was added to the Oxford English Dictionary.

References

External links
The Lunch Club
Meet The Neighbors
Speed Friending

Year of birth missing (living people)
Living people
People from the East Village, Manhattan
American businesspeople